Chris Yu (born October 30, 1968) is a Taiwanese singer and songwriter.

Known for his ballads, Yu has written for several pop music artists, including Alan Tam, Andy Lau, Stefanie Sun, Sammi Cheng, Coco Lee, and Cass Phang.

His 2002 release Falling in Love with Chris Yu 2002 Love Song was one of the best-selling albums of the year in Taiwan.

In 2010, Yu became a judge on the seventh season of One Million Star. He was also a judge on the third season of Million Star, which aired in 2013.

Discography

Studio albums

Extended plays

Compilation albums

Singles

Filmography

Television

Awards and nominations

References

External links
 
 Chris Yu at Deezer
 Chris Yu at KKBox

1968 births
Living people
Musicians from Taipei
20th-century Taiwanese  male singers
21st-century Taiwanese  male singers
Taiwanese singer-songwriters